YCF, acronym for Yacimientos Carboníferos Fiscales (Spanish for Fiscal Coal Fields), was an Argentine state-owned company dedicated to exploiting coal deposits in the Argentine mainland, mainly the field near to Rio Turbio.

The company was succeeded in 1994 by Yacimientos Carboníferos Río Turbio.

History 

The company was founded 1958 and it existed until 1994, when it was privatised and renamed as Yacimientos Carboníferos Río Turbio S.A.

Prior to the creation of YCF, Argentina used to import coal. This became a problem during World War II, when a severe shortage caused problems to such key sectors as industry and transport. Production peaked in 1972 when it reached 570,000 tons.

The coal was mined in Rio Turbio and transported to the port city of Rio Gallegos.

See also

YPF
Yacimientos Carboníferos Río Turbio

References

External links 
  Ley Nº 22.775 "Modifícanse las Partidas de Gastos y Recursos de la Empresa del Estado Yacimientos Carboníferos Fiscales para el ejercicio 1980"  - InfoLeg website (accessed 2016-10-07)

Coal companies of Argentina